Desert Museum may refer to:

 Desert Museum (Mexico), in Saltillo, Coahuila
 Arizona-Sonora Desert Museum, Arizona, USA
 High Desert Museum, Oregon, USA
 Palm Springs Art Museum, formerly the Palm Springs Desert Museum, California, USA